The Battle of Aschaffenburg was a 10 day battle fought between the forces of the United States 7th Army and 3rd Army on one side, and Nazi Germany on the other during World War II.

History
Upon Adolf Hitler's decree that the city be used as a Festungsstadt (fortress city) German armed forces, with support of the local populace, concentrated their defense of the Wetterau-Main-Tauber line in the strategically important city in an effort to repel the allied invasion of Germany. The battle posed an unexpected challenge to allied war planners in the late stages of the conflict and saw German leadership resorting to increasingly desperate attempts at motivating their personnel to continue the fight. 

Following extensive urban combat with severe losses to the German side, Major Emil Lamberth surrendered to LTC Felix L. Sparks at 9am on 3 April 1945 after hanging white flags from the damaged towers of Schloss Johannisburg. In his news conference of 7 April 1945, Secretary of War Henry L. Stimson noted: "There is a lesson with respect to [fighting to the end] in Aschaffenburg. There Nazi fanatics used the visible threat of two hangings to compel German soldiers and civilians to fight for a week."

References 

Aschaffenburg